The Ralph W. Shattuck House is a historic duplex house in Arlington, Massachusetts.  The -story wood frame double house was built c. 1875, and is one of the best-preserved Italianate houses in the town.  It has a heavily bracketed cornice line, a bracketed hood sheltering the two entrances, and decorative window surrounds with small brackets at the lintel.  It was owned by Ralph W. Shattuck, proprietor of Shattuck Hardware, one of Arlington's longest-running businesses.

The house was listed on the National Register of Historic Places in 1985.

See also
National Register of Historic Places listings in Arlington, Massachusetts

References

Houses on the National Register of Historic Places in Arlington, Massachusetts
Houses in Arlington, Massachusetts